100 is the first EP of Christian hip hop artist KB, released on March 4, 2014.

Reception

Commercial performance
The EP debuted at number 22 on the Billboard 200 with first-week sales of 14,000 copies.

Critical reception

David Jeffries from allmusic gave the EP a 3.5 out of 5 praising the overall album-like quality. Michael Weaver of Jesusfreakhideout gave the EP a 3 out of 5 saying: "While it's great to see KB back in the mix, it's also a bit disappointing to see him not reach his full potential. "100" and "Undefeated" offer some enjoyment, with "Kamikaze" also being a decent track, but the other half of the EP may leave you scratching your head. There are a couple of tracks worth grabbing, but more than anything, this EP has me wondering what KB may have in store for his next full-length record. Hopefully it's more Weight & Glory and less 100 EP".

Track listing

Charts

References

2014 debut EPs
KB (rapper) albums
Reach Records albums
Albums produced by Gawvi
Albums produced by Beam